Laura Ioana Paar (née Andrei; born 31 May 1988) is a Romanian tennis player.

She has career-high WTA rankings of 190 in singles, achieved on 31 January 2021, and 113 in doubles, set on 9 March 2020. Laura has won one doubles title on the WTA Tour, as well as 13 singles and 53 doubles titles on the ITF Circuit.

Career
She started tennis at age six and is coached by German Calin Alexandru Paar.
In December 2016, she won the singles and the doubles at the ITF Cordenons tournament.

On 19 May 2019, she made her WTA Tour debut when she entered the main draw of the Nürnberger Versicherungscup by defeating Raluca Șerban in the qualifying round.

Grand Slam performance timelines

Singles

Doubles

WTA career finals

Doubles: 1 (title)

ITF Circuit finals

Singles: 30 (13 titles, 17 runner–ups)

Doubles: 88 (53 titles, 35 runner–ups)

Notes

References

External links

 
 

1988 births
Living people
Tennis players from Bucharest
Romanian female tennis players